Gopinath Das is an Indian politician and member of the All India Trinamool Congress. Das was member of the Assam Legislative Assembly from the Boko constituency in South Kamrup district.

References 

All India United Democratic Front politicians
Assam MLAs 1985–1991
Assam MLAs 1991–1996
Assam MLAs 2001–2006
Assam MLAs 2011–2016
Living people
People from Kamrup district
Indian National Congress politicians
Trinamool Congress politicians
Year of birth missing (living people)